KK AV Ohrid was a basketball club based in Ohrid, North Macedonia. They played in the Macedonian First League from 2014 until 2019.

History

Beginnings
AV Ohrid is a rather new club on the basketball map of the region, as well as Macedonia, as it has been founded only in 2015 by Milčo Doneski. With steady organization and high ambitions, the club has qualified for the top-tier Macedonian domestic club league in their first season.

Glory Days
The club took one of the spots in the 2nd division of the ABA League in the 2017/18 season, its first international appearance.

Honours

League Achievements
 Macedonian Second League champion - 2015–16

Notable players

 Slobodan Mihajlovski
 Branko Janeski
 Marjan Mladenović
 Stevan Gligorijević
 Filip Bakoč
 Stefan Mladenović
 Milojko Vasilić
 Saša Đorđević
 Luka Milojević
 Emir Zimić
 Stanislav Tsonkov
 Devin Brooks
 Kaylen Shane
 Phil Henry
 KC Ross-Miller
 Dmitri Nekrasov
 Liam Thomas
 Rémi Barry
 Martin Junaković
 Mirza Ahmetbašić

Notable coaches
 Petar Čočoroski

References

External links
 Official Website
 Web & Live Video for Season 2015/2016
 Eurobasket.com KK AV Ohrid Page
 

Basketball teams in North Macedonia
Ohrid Municipality